Kota Harapan Indah, or Harapan Indah, is a planned township at Cakung, East Jakarta and Pejuang, Medan Satria, Bekasi, West Java, Indonesia. It is a rapidly developing community with its own supermarket, school, sports club and a number of office buildings with plans to develop a new shopping centre. Land area of the township is about 2,200 hectares. It forms border with the capital Jakarta and within Greater Jakarta area.

Facilities

Ace Hardware, 
Santika Premier Hotel,
Carrefour,
Lotte Mart 
Courts Megastore
Esa Unggul University
BPK Penabur School, 
Sekolah Al Azhar, 
Transera Waterpark, 
Gramedia Book Store 
RS Ananda Harapan Indah,
RS Citra Harapan
Transera water-park
Harapan Indah sports club

Apartment
Mall Harapan Indah

Transportation
TransJakarta operates a BRT route from Harapan Indah, labeled as 2B. Bus shelters are located at the bazaar, at the gateway, as well as in various places alongside the Harapan Indah Boulevard. Plenty of taxi cabs are available in the suburb, as well as commuter line, other bus services, as well as the Jakarta LRT, currently under construction.

See also
Greater Jakarta

References

Bekasi
Planned townships in Indonesia
Post-independence architecture of Indonesia